AT&T Information Systems (ATTIS), originally known as American Bell, was the fully separate subsidiary of American Telephone & Telegraph Company (AT&T) which focused on computer technology ventures and telephone sales, and other unregulated business. It was one of the three core units of AT&T formed after the breakup of the Bell System.

History

After the breakup of the Bell System, which became effective in January 1984, AT&T Corporation—the world's largest company—was allowed to enter the computer market. In 1979 and 1980, the Federal Communications Commission (FCC) conducted Computer Inquiry I and II, which restricted Western Electric from selling "enhanced services", such as telephone equipment and other unregulated business, except through a fully separated AT&T subsidiary. As a result, American Bell, Inc. was formed, and began operations in 1982.

Observers expected American Bell, with Bell Labs and Western Electric, to challenge market leader IBM, and saw its first 3B series computers in March 1984 as the most important products in the industry since the IBM PC in 1981. AT&T, they thought, had the technology to become an important computer company, while its large size would reassure customers that its products would not become orphaned technology. Employees at American Bell who worked in AT&T facilities that housed Bell Labs and Western Electric offices often encountered bureaucratic red tape, such as restrictions on using the one library in the same building because it was owned by Bell Labs.

American Bell contained two core units:
American Bell Consumer Products - sold residential telephones/terminal equipment
American Bell Advanced Information Systems - sold business telephone/terminal equipment, such as the American Bell Merlin system, PCs, and mid-sized computers running on the company's proprietary Unix operating system.

On January 1, 1983, a year prior to the final breakup of the Bell System in 1984, American Bell Advanced Information Systems (AIS) was launched as an unregulated AT&T subsidiary with a mission to directly challenge IBM in the communications/computer space. Led by Mr. Archie J. McGill, who joined AT&T in 1973 after a rapid rise at the International Business Machines Corporation. McGill was charged with transitioning and positioning the telephone company for the era of deregulated head-to-head competition in the high-tech market. The new enterprise was introduced to the world with a splash on New Year's Eve 1983 at New York Times Square when the traditional New Year's Eve crystal countdown ball was replaced with a crystal version of the new American Bell Advanced Information System's "Globe" logo. In 1984, the American Bell Advanced Information Systems name was changed to AT&T Information Systems.

Logo
The AT&T Globe logo, originally designed by Saul Bass and sometimes informally called the "Death Star" for its visual similarity to the weapon of that name in the Star Wars movie franchise, originated for use with American Bell. When Judge Greene banned AT&T from using any Bell marks whatsoever after the breakup, except for usage of the Bell Labs name, AT&T switched over to the Globe logo.

Post-breakup
Since AT&T was required to divest the Bell logo and trademark to the Baby Bells, American Bell was renamed AT&T Information Systems on January 1, 1984. The business unit, American Bell Advanced Information Systems, was absorbed into AT&T Network Systems, while American Bell Consumer Products, renamed AT&T Consumer Products, became a unit of AT&T Technologies. 

AT&T Information Systems held its status as separate from any other AT&T company until 1986, following several FCC decisions which loosened restrictions set before the breakup. It was completely absorbed into American Telephone and Telegraph Company in 1989.

References

AT&T subsidiaries
Bell System
American companies established in 1983
American companies disestablished in 1989
Computer companies established in 1983
Computer companies disestablished in 1989
Defunct computer companies of the United States